San Francisco de Becerra is a municipality in the interior of the Honduran department of Olancho, slightly to the south. It is bordered by Juticalpa in the west and Catacamas in the east.

Demographics
At the time of the 2013 Honduras census, San Francisco de Becerra municipality had a population of 9,475. Of these, 97.20% were Mestizo, 1.56% White, 0.93% Black or Afro-Honduran, 0.30% Indigenous and 0.01% others.

Sports
Local football club Alianza de Becerra play in the Honduran second division.

References

Municipalities of the Olancho Department